Ludwig Joseph Cramolini, real name Ludwig Joseph Kramolin (20 March 1805 – 28 October 1884 in Darmstadt) was an Austrian operatic tenor and theatre director.

Life 
Born in Vienna (Austrian Empire), Cramolini first began studying painting at the Academy of Fine Arts Vienna on 20 July 1819, but then switched to music. On 27 February 1824, he made his Vienna debut in the opera Joconde by Nicolas Isouard and was subsequently engaged at the Theater am Kärntnertor until 1837. In 1826/27 he was engaged to the opera singer Nanette Schechner, and he also belonged to the circle of friends around Franz Schubert. He also met Ludwig van Beethoven several times, whom he first visited in Mödling in 1818, the last time in February 1827, together with his fiancée. He left extensive memories of both composers.

From 1837, Cramolini was active in Brunswick, where he enjoyed great popularity and William, Duke of Brunswick had him portrayed for his private gallery. In 1841, he became a member of the court theatre in Darmstadt, where he again enjoyed great triumphs and also worked as an opera director from February 1858. In 1874, he celebrated his 50th anniversary as an artist and retired soon after.

A letter from Remigius Adrianus Haanen to Cramolini has survived from the Darmstadt period.

Family 
Cramolini was a son of the painter Johann Baptist Cramolini, who came from Bohemia. (29 December 1776 in Karlsbad – 21 November 1843 in Vienna) from his marriage to Anna Englbert. His brother was the painter Eduard Cramolini (16 July 1807 in Vienna – 13 October 1881, Vienna).

References

Further reading
 Ludwig Eisenberg: Ludwig Cramolini. In Großes biographisches Lexikon der deutschen Bühne im XIX. Jahrhundert. Paul List publisher, Leipzig 1903,  (daten.digitale-sammlungen.de).
 Schubert. Die Erinnerungen seiner Freunde, edited by Otto Erich Deutsch. 2nd edition. Breitkopf & Härtel, Leipzig 1983, 
 Carl Nödl: Franz Schubert und die Künstlerfamilie Cramolini, Vienna 2001
 Peter Clive: Beethoven and his World: A Biographical Dictionary, New York: Oxford University Press 2001,  (books.google.com)
 Klaus Martin Kopitz, Rainer Cadenbach (ed.) among others: Beethoven aus der Sicht seiner Zeitgenossen in Tagebüchern, Briefen, Gedichten und Erinnerungen. Vol. 1: Adamberger – Kuffner. Published by the Beethoven-Forschungsstelle at the Universität der Künste Berlin. Henle, Munich 2009, .

External links 
 Cramolini (Wilke), Ludwig on BMLO

Austrian operatic tenors
1805 births
1884 deaths
Musicians from Vienna